Yordan (Escalante) Manduley  (born March 30, 1986) is a Cuban professional baseball shortstop who is a free agent. He also plays for the Holguín baseball team in the Cuban National Series.

Career
Manduley began his professional career with the Québec Capitales of the Can-Am League in 2015. From 2015 to 2019, Manduley hit .313 with 362 hits and 7 home runs over 1,158 at-bats for the Capitales. 

Manduley did not play in 2020 due to the cancellation of the Frontier League season because of the COVID-19 pandemic, and also did not play in 2021. In 2022, Manduley played in 50 games for Québec, slashing .251/.305/.331 with 3 home runs, 21 RBI, and 15 stolen bases. On December 5, 2022, Manduley was released by the Capitales by having his contract option declined.

International career
Manduley played for the Cuban national baseball team at the 2014 Central American and Caribbean Games, 2015 Pan American Games, 2015 Premier 12, 2017 World Baseball Classic, and 2019 Pan American Games.

References

External links

1986 births
Living people
Cuban baseball players
Baseball shortstops
Naranjas de Villa Clara players
Sabuesos de Holquin players
Québec Capitales players
2017 World Baseball Classic players
Pan American Games bronze medalists for Cuba
Baseball players at the 2015 Pan American Games
Baseball players at the 2019 Pan American Games
Pan American Games medalists in baseball
Medalists at the 2015 Pan American Games
Cuban expatriate baseball players in Venezuela
Navegantes del Magallanes players
People from Holguín